Coleophora parenthella is a moth of the family Coleophoridae. It is found in Ukraine and China.

References

parenthella
Moths of Europe
Moths of Asia
Moths described in 1952